Ardence was a software company headquartered in Waltham, Massachusetts with representatives in Washington, D.C.; Virginia Beach, VA; Chicago, IL; Denton, TX; and in Europe, the Middle East, Africa and India. It developed a software-streaming product and an embedded OEM development platform. It was founded in 1980 as VenturCom.

On December 20, 2006, Citrix Systems Inc. announced an agreement to acquire Ardence. In 2008, some former Ardence executives acquired the Ardence programs from Citrix and formed IntervalZero.

History
VenturCom was founded in 1980, by Marc H. Meyer, Doug Mook, Bill Spencer and Myron Zimmerman. The company changed its name to Ardence in 2004.

On December 20, 2006, Citrix Systems Inc. announced an agreement to acquire Ardence.

In 2008, a group of former Ardence executives founded IntervalZero and acquired the Ardence embedded software business from Citrix. Citrix retained a minority ownership the firm.

Products
The enterprise software-streaming product deployed Microsoft Windows, SUSE Linux, Red Hat Linux and Turbolinux operating systems, along with all their applications, on demand from networked storage.  It allowed any x86-based computer - desktop, server, or device - to be provisioned, or re-provisioned from bare metal.

The core technology behind the software streaming product was a device driver for the selected operating system, which mounts a virtual disk over a custom UDP protocol.  Basically, computers were configured to netboot a kernel that contained this device driver.

Awards
In 2005, Ardence won the ComputerWorld Horizon Award.

In 2006, Ardence won the CRN Best In Show Award at IBM PartnerWorld.

See also
Venix

References

External links
 
 Research report on Ardence by infoworld
 Software-Streaming in Education
 Computer World Article on Software-Streaming

Citrix Systems
Software companies based in Massachusetts
Software companies established in 1980
Defunct software companies of the United States
2006 mergers and acquisitions
Software companies disestablished in 2008
2008 disestablishments in Massachusetts
1980 establishments in Massachusetts